Seyid Ali Imadaddin Nasimi (1369/70 – 1418/19), commonly known as Nasimi, was a 14th and 15th century Azerbaijani Hurufi poet. He is regarded as one of the greatest Turkic poets of his time and one of the most prominent figures in Azerbaijani literature.

Nasimi was born around 1369–70 and spoke fluent Azerbaijani, Persian and Arabic. He received a good education and was drawn to Sufism at an early age. After becoming a faithful adherent of the Hurufism movement, Nasimi left Azerbaijan to spread Hurufism in Anatolia and later Aleppo following the execution of its founder and Nasimi's teacher, Fazlallah Astarabadi. In Aleppo, he gained followers as a Hurufi sheikh but faced resistance from Sunni circles who eventually convinced the Mamluk sultan to order his death for his religious beliefs around 1418–19. Nasimi was executed and buried in a tekke (Sufi lodge) in Aleppo.

His surviving works include two divans (collections of short poems) of poetry in Azerbaijani and Persian, along with some poems in Arabic. Nasimi's poems mainly centre around Hurufism and contain many references to Islamic texts. His poetry combines harmonious melodies and easily understood expressions with more complex topics related to religion. Nasimi had great influence on Turkic literature and influenced many major future poets such as Habibi, Haqiqi (pen name of Jahan Shah), Khatai (pen name of Ismail I), among others. He is also considered the founder of Azerbaijani classical aruz poetry (poetry using quantifying prosody) and the first lyrical poet in Oghuz Turkic classic literature.

Name 
Nasimi's given name was Ali, but he adopted the epithet (laqab) Imadaddin, which superseded his original name in use. Some sources attribute other names to him, such as Nesîmüddin, Celâleddin and Ömer. His patronymic was Ebü’l-Fazl.

His most prevalent pen name was Nasimi. Its etymology is disputed but most plausibly explained as an echo of Naimi, the pen name of Nasimi's teacher Fazlallah Astarabadi. It may also have been derived from the Arabic word nasim, meaning "breeze, breath of wind". He also employed other pen names sporadically, such as Hüseyni, Haşimi, Seyyid, Ali and İmad. His epithet Imadaddin or the title "seyid"  (marking his claim of descent from the Islamic prophet Muhammad) are often added in order to distinguish him from other figures who also bore the name Nasimi.

Biography 
Nasimi's life is largely obscure. His year of birth is uncertain, but it is commonly assumed to be 1369–70 without conclusive evidence. His exact birthplace is also contested: it could be Shamakhi, Tabriz, Baghdad, Aleppo, Shiraz or Diyarbakir. He was of Azerbaijani Turkic origin and spoke Azerbaijani as his native language, as well as fluent Persian and Arabic.

Nasimi had a good education as a child and pursued Sufism at an early age. While in Tabriz, he met the mystic Fazlallah Astarabadi who introduced him to Hurufism. Nasimi stayed with him in Baku and Shirvan for some time and became one of the most faithful adherents of the Hurufism movement, as well as Astarabadi's successor (khalifa). After the Timurid emperor Miran Shah executed Astarabadi for his religious views, Nasimi left Azerbaijan and travelled to Anatolia to spread Hurufism. He arrived in Bursa during Murad I’s (1362–1389) reign but was not welcomed there. He also attempted to meet the Sufi saint Haji Bayram Veli in Ankara but was turned away because of his Hurufi beliefs.

Unable to find a suitable environment for his beliefs in Anatolia, he went to Aleppo, which was the main centre of Hurufis in Syria at that time. Islamic scholar Ibn Hajar al-Asqalani wrote about Nasimi's activity in Aleppo as a Hurufi sheikh and his increasing followers. He used his poetry skills to further spread his beliefs. His ideas such as "God's manifestation on the human face" and "describing all the body organs with letters" faced resistance in Sunni circles. Some contemporary Arab sources say that a group of Sunni Muslim scholars, who followed the main schools of law, tried to get Nasimi killed by the Mamluk deputy of Aleppo based on vague rumours, but they failed. The deputy then reportedly referred the case to the Mamluk sultan Al-Mu'ayyad Shaykh (1412–1421) in Cairo, who ordered Nasimi's death. Some sources state that he was killed by being flayed, but there is no clear evidence of this in contemporary sources. Some texts do mention flaying, but it may have been done posthumously for the purpose of public display. The most likely year of execution is 1418–9, although some historians suggest 1417 and other dates have been proposed. His body was buried in a tekke named after him in Aleppo.

Nasimi's execution is believed to have had a political component due to his Turkic ancestry which brought him closer to Mamluks' rival Turkic dynasties in Syria and Anatolia. Al-Mu'ayyad's order to distribute pieces of Nasimi's body to local Turkic rulers like the Dulkadir and the Aq Qoyunlu was clearly motivated by politics.

Poetry 

Nasimi's surviving works include two divans (collections of short poems), one in Azerbaijani and the other in Persian. He may have also had a divan in Arabic, but no evidence of one has been discovered. His Azerbaijani divan contains over four hundred ghazals and several hundred other poems, including mathnawis and quatrains. According to Turkologist Kathleen Burrill, Nasimi was able to maintain the quality of his Azerbaijani language in his poetry while using the aruz form (poetry using quantifying prosody). This sets him apart from later poets who relied heavily on borrowing from Persian due to their lack of skill in mastering the aruz form. His Persian divan consists of almost three hundred ghazals and discusses topics such as Hurufism, praise to Twelve Imams and Imam Ali, as well as Fazlallah Astarabadi.

Nasimi's writing style often involves repeating sounds and grammatical patterns. His poems mainly centre around Hurufism and contain many references to Islamic texts such as the Quran. However, some of the beliefs behind his poems fall outside of mainstream Islam. Nasimi's poetry combines easily understood expressions with more complex topics related to Hurufism. While his poems have remained popular due to their emotional depth and technical skill, the ideas behind them have not been as widely understood. Some of Nasimi's poems can be difficult to read due to their complex religious references, but others are skillfully written and flow with harmonious melodies that express his themes of love.

Legacy 
Nasimi is considered one of the greatest figures of Turkic literature. His influence on poetry extended throughout the Turkic world and impacted major poets such as Habibi, Haqiqi (pen name of Jahan Shah), Khatai (pen name of Ismail I), and others. Nasimi is also regarded as the founder of Azerbaijani classical aruz poetry and the first lyrical poet in Oghuz Turkic classic literature. His works had a significant impact on the development of both Azerbaijani and Ottoman literature. In fact, Nasimi's style has largely influenced the general style of Azerbaijani poetry. Timurid poet Ali-Shir Nava'i's words of praise about Nasimi show that he was also considered an important figure in the Central Asian Turkic world.

Nasimi is highly revered in Azerbaijan and has a district in the capital city of Baku named after him. In 1973, UNESCO declared the 600th anniversary of Nasimi’s birthday to be celebrated worldwide. Representatives from many countries participated in the celebrations held in Baku and Moscow.

Notes

References

Sources

External links 
 
 

Arabic-language poets
Azerbaijani poets
Persian-language poets
People executed for heresy
People executed by flaying
1369 births
1419 deaths
Bektashi Order